Argentina and South Africa first met in 1993. Until 2012, these two teams did not tour each other regularly and encounters between them were rare in the professional era. 

This changed in 2012, when Argentina joined the SANZAR nations in the annual Rugby Championship tournament (formerly the Tri Nations). Argentina avoided defeat for the first time in the second match of the 2012 Rugby Championship with a draw on home ground, and won for the first time in the shortened Rugby Championship in 2015, in South Africa. 

During the 2016 Rugby Championship, Argentina earned their first ever home victory over South Africa on 27 August.

Summary

Overall

Records
Note: Date shown in brackets indicates when the record was or last set.

Results

List of series

References	 

 
Argentina national rugby union team matches
South Africa national rugby union team matches
Argentina–South Africa relations